Stanley Beck (born June 5, 1936) is an American film producer and actor of the stage, television, and film. As an actor, he is best known for his portrayal of Stanly in the 1969 film John and Mary and Artie Silver in the 1974 film Lenny. He has produced three films during his career, Straight Time (1978), Death Valley (1982), and Man, Woman and Child (1983).

A life member of The Actors Studio, three of Beck's notable stage appearances occurred, in rapid succession, in two Arthur Miller premieres, Incident at Vichy (1964) and After The Fall (1964), as well as the original production of Eugene O'Neill's Marco Millions (1964). Another notable portrayal was that of Ed Busby in the premiere of William Snyder's The Days and Nights of BeeBee Fenstermaker (1962).

Filmography

References

External links

1936 births
Living people
20th-century American male actors
Male actors from New York City
Actors Studio alumni
American film producers
American male film actors
American male stage actors
American male television actors